The Atlas day gecko (Quedenfeldtia trachyblepharus) is a species of lizard in the family Sphaerodactylidae. The species is endemic to Morocco.

Taxonomy
This species shares the common name of Atlas day gecko with another species, Quedenfeldtia moerens.

Biology
Q. trachyblepharus is diurnal, and is adapted to cold climates.  Its natural habitat is rocky areas. Q. trachyblepharus is the dominant species in the alpine lizard assemblage above . It is an oviparous species.

References

Further reading
Böttger [sic], Oskar (1873). "Reptilien von Marocco und von den canarischen Inseln ". Abhandlungen Senckenbergischen Naturforschenden Gesellschaft, Frankfurt am Main 9: 121-191 + one unnumbered plate. (Gymnodactylus trachyblepharus, new species, pp. 138-140 + plate, figures 3a, 3b). (in German).
Loveridge A (1947). "Revision of the African Lizards of the Family Gekkonidae". Bulletin of the Museum of Comparative Zoölogy at Harvard College 98: 1-469 + Plates 1-7. (Quedenfeldtia trachyblepharus, new combination, pp. 67-69).

Quedenfeldtia
Endemic fauna of Morocco
Reptiles described in 1873
Reptiles of North Africa
Taxonomy articles created by Polbot